Manhenga is a growth point in Bindura District of Mashonaland Central province in Zimbabwe.

Populated places in Mashonaland Central Province